Occhi di Lupo (literally "wolf eyes") is a variety of large-sized, tubular pasta, served with a stuffing or filling, whose ingredients typically include extra virgin olive oil, ricotta, grated pecorino cheese, and aromatic herbs such as parsley and basil.

References

Types of pasta